Sir Michael Morland (born 16 July 1929) is a retired British judge. He was a Justice of the High Court (Queen's Bench Division) from 1989 to 2004.

See also
Judiciary of England and Wales

References

External links
 https://www.ukwhoswho.com/view/10.1093/ww/9780199540884.001.0001/ww-9780199540884-e-28116

Queen's Bench Division judges
Knights Bachelor
1929 births
Living people
Place of birth missing (living people)
20th-century British judges